The 2022 Davis Cup World Group II Play-offs were held on 4–5 March 2022. The twelve winning teams from the play-offs qualified for the 2022 Davis Cup World Group II and the twelve losing teams would play at the Group III of the corresponding continental zone.

Teams
Twenty-four teams played for twelve spots in the World Group II, in series decided on a home and away basis.

These twenty-four teams are:
 2 losing teams from World Group II Knock-out ties.
 12 losing teams from World Group II.
 10 teams from their Group III zone:
 3 from Europe
 3 from Asia/Oceania,
 2 from Americas, and
 2 from Africa.

The 12 winning teams from the play-offs would play at the World Group II and the 12 losing teams will play at the Group III of the corresponding continental zone.

#: Nations Ranking as of 20 September 2021.

Qualified teams

  (#42)
  (#48)
  (#50)
  (#53)
  (#55)
  (#58)
  (#59)
  (#60)
  (#61)
  (#62)
  (#63)
  (#64)

  (#65)
  (#66)
  (#67)
  (#68)
  (#69)
  (#70)
  (#71)
  (#75)
  (#77)
  (#79=)
  (#79=)
  (#81)

Results summary

World Group II Play-offs results

China vs. Ireland

Dominican Republic vs. Vietnam

Thailand vs. Latvia

Guatemala vs. Chinese Taipei

Indonesia vs. Venezuela

Estonia vs. Pacific Oceania

Egypt vs. Cyprus

Greece vs. Jamaica

Monaco vs. Morocco

Bulgaria vs. Paraguay

Zimbabwe vs. El Salvador

Benin vs. Hong Kong

References

External links

World Group
Davis Cup
Davis Cup
Davis Cup
Davis Cup